William Kendrick Gregory (born November 16, 1978) is an American former professional basketball player.  He played the shooting guard and small forward positions. He is 6 ft 5 ¾ in (1.97 m) in height.

Amateur career
Mr. Ohio, Gregory played high-school basketball at Independence High School in Columbus, Ohio. He played college basketball at the University of Kansas, where he played with the Kansas Jayhawks men's basketball team from 1997 to 2001.

Pro career
Despite a very large wingspan for a guard of 6'11" (2.11 m) and some very impressive athletic scores at the 2001 NBA pre-draft camp, such as recording the highest no-step vertical jump (40") and the highest maximum vertical jump (46") that have ever been measured at the camp, Gregory went undrafted in the 2001 NBA draft.

Gregory was then signed for the 2001–02 season by the Greenville Groove of the D-League. He played the 2002 summer season with the Dodge City Legend in the United States Basketball League before moving to the British Basketball League for the 2002–03 season, where he played with the Chester Jets. He then moved to Italy for the 2003–04 season to the team Nuova Pallacanestro Pavia, of the Italian Second Division League.

He moved to the French League for the 2005–06 season, to the team Le Mans Sarthe Basket. He played with Le Mans during the 2006–07 season as well. He then moved to the Turkish League for the 2007–08 season, where he played with Efes Pilsen S.K.

Gregory moved to the Greek League club PAOK BC for the 2008–09 season. In February 2009, and as PAOK BC was facing financial problems, he moved to the ACB to play for Pamesa Valencia, only to return to the Greek League in the summer of 2009, again for PAOK BC.

In September 2010 he signed with KK Union Olimpija.

In December 2011 he signed with SLUC Nancy Basket.

References

External links
ACB.com Profile
Basketball-reference Profile
Euroleague.net Profile
TBLStat.net Profile

1978 births
Living people
ABA League players
American expatriate basketball people in France
American expatriate basketball people in Greece
American expatriate basketball people in Italy
American expatriate basketball people in Slovenia
American expatriate basketball people in Spain
American expatriate basketball people in the United Kingdom
American expatriate basketball people in Turkey
Anadolu Efes S.K. players
Cheshire Jets players
Greek Basket League players
Greenville Groove players
Kansas Jayhawks men's basketball players
KK Olimpija players
Le Mans Sarthe Basket players
Liga ACB players
McDonald's High School All-Americans
Pallacanestro Pavia players
P.A.O.K. BC players
Parade High School All-Americans (boys' basketball)
Shooting guards
Small forwards
SLUC Nancy Basket players
Valencia Basket players
American men's basketball players